Formarinsee is a lake in the Austrian Alps. It lies in the Bundesland of Vorarlberg and lends its name to the close by Formarinbach, one of the two source rivers of the River Lech.

As part of the ORF TV program "9 places, 9 treasures", the Formarinsee with the Rote Wand (2 km north of the lake) was voted Austria's most beautiful place on October 24th, 2015.

Photo gallery

References

Lakes of Vorarlberg